Justified Action is a 1993 Australian film about the head of international security for a corporation who tracks down a Japanese businessman. The film features Don Swayze and Peter Phelps, and is directed by Rene Nagy Jr.

Plot

Cast
Don Swayze as Curtis Carter
Peter Phelps as Eddie Carter
Christine Ongley as Sarah Jordan
Mark Hembrow as Richard Carter
John Samaha as Vinny
Summer Nicks as Wilton Lineker
Richard Carter as Sam
Michael Julian Knowles as Bennett

Production
The film had a budget of $2.9 million and was filmed in January and February 1993. The film was produced by Westworld Film Productions with Jack Samardzisa as Executive Producer and Rene Nagy Jr. as Producer. The script was written by Elliot A. Mcgarva and the film was edited by Gary Woodyard. Kevan Lind was director of photography.

References

External links
Justified Action at the British Film Institute

Australian drama films
1993 films
1990s Australian films